Municipal Guards, also called the Municipal Civil Guards (Guardas Civis Municipais, singular: Municipal Civil Guard), are the security forces of municipalities (cities) of Brazil. They are subordinated to the municipality mayors (prefeitos). Trained as a civilian uniformed agency, the city guards are responsible to protect the municipal properties and installations, according to the Brazilian Federal Constitution.

Their patrols are called rondas (rounds) and there are 1,200 municipalities with Municipal Guards with more than 120,000 operatives according with the Brazilian Institute of Geography and Statistics. They are treated as police officers by the former president of the IPA (International Police Association) Brazilian section, Mr. George Henry Millard. The former Brazilian Minister of Justice and elected governor of the state of Rio Grande do Sul, Mr. Tarso Genro, asked for them to be given more jurisdiction for their operatives, and especially for their official recognition by Brazil as public safety workers.

Legal basis
The Brazilian Federal Constitution, Title III, Article 144, § 
(paragraph 8th) defines the mission of The Municipal Guards:
And federal law 14022 of 2014. redefining the guards' minimum operating principles.  The minimum principles of action of municipal guards are:

 I - protection of fundamental human rights, the exercise of citizenship and public freedoms;

 II - preservation of life, reduction of suffering and reduction of losses;

 III - preventive patrolling;

 IV - commitment to the social evolution of the community;  and
"...Protection of goods, services and facilities..." (ipsis literis citation )
Organizing, directing and monitoring vehicle traffic in their territory
Ensuring the right of the community to enjoy or use public goods, obeying the legal requirements
Protecting the environment and historical, cultural and ecological heritage of the municipality
Providing assistance for domestic and foreign tourists

Civil Guard
The Municipal Civil Guard is a type of municipal civil police which can be created by specific laws of the chamber of the councilmen of the city as an instrument for public security in the city. Its components possess the same prerogatives and legal obligations as the municipality's employees. The GCM, as it is known, can still assist the other agencies of public security, such as: the Federal Police, Federal Road Police, Federal Railroad Police, Civil Police, (including the Superintendence of State Scientific Police Service) and the Military Police including the Corps of Military Firemen. By a "súmula" (Portuguese for "ruling", or stare decisis) of the Supreme Federal Tribunal, the scientific police are considered a branch of the Civil Police because of the principle of the indivisibility of criminal inquiry, fitting into the States of the Brazilian Federation that had conferred it autonomy, to subordinate it, again, to those institutions.

In São Paulo they receive the name Metropolitan Civil Guard. The use of navy blue uniforms for the Guards has been stipulated. In Rio de Janeiro it is only called only Municipal Guard and the uniform color is khakis. The Civil Guards are organizations of civil, not militarized organizations. Civil Guards of the cities with 20,000 inhabitants are authorized to carry firearms. Firearms are only allowed with legal authorization. The transport is granted by the Federal government (Policy Statute of the Disarmament).

Up to 1965, the Civil Police of the most populous States of Brazil had in its administrative structure a full integration with the Civil Guard, but the police reforms in the beginning of the 20th century and designated them as preventive police, together, with the Military Police. These reforms were made more clear in the Coup D'état on March 30, 1964; which ended autonomy in the Brazilian federal subjects (the Union, the Federal District, The States of Union and the Autonomal Municipalities). The idea was to eliminate any resistance against the military regime. The Great Goal of the act was the elimination of the Republican State Civilian Guardas as well as the Republican Municipal Civilian Guardas.

The deriving government of the Military Coup of '64, establishing rigid control on the municipal and state uniformed police forces, extinguished the Civil Guards and many Municipal Guards too. They also succeeded in regulating the supervisory norms of the Army on the Military Police and nominated an official of the Army to command them in all the States.

Constitutional Amendment 
There is a PEC (Proposal of Constitutional Amendment, PEC nº 534/2002) which would change the Brazilian City/Municipal Guards constitutional status.  If approved, the good use of police power will be regulated to every Municipal Guard Corps to serve and protect the Brazilian cities and citizens, transforming these corporations into law enforcement agencies de jure (The Brazilian people consider the Guardas policemen de facto, and the Brazilian Ministry of Justice are treating the guards as constables. However, the Brazilian State Police Forces do not agree with this ideal- Indeed, all the municipal guard operatives accuses the State sheriffs and colonels of interfering in the municipality autonomy. In Portuguese, this act is called "ingerência").

The PEC was approved in the Brazilian Federal Senate and the Brazilian Federal House of Representatives Justice Commission (now it is waiting to be approved in the Brazilian Federal House of Representatives, in two voting sessions, with open vote).

See also
Brazilian Federal Police
Civil Police of Brazilian States
Law enforcement in Brazil
Força Nacional de Segurança
Military of Brazil
Military Police of Brazilian States

http://www.planalto.gov.br/ccivil_03/_ato2011-2014/2014/lei/l13022.htm

References

External links

Portuguese only
 guardas municipais association site
 PEC law site
 PEC law site
 Ministério da Justiça
 STIVE - Site sobre Segurança Pública

English language links
 IPA Official website
 Municipal police

Law enforcement agencies of Brazil
Municipal law enforcement agencies